Reino Kuivamäki (17 May 1918 – 26 May 1982) was a Finnish athlete. He competed in the men's hammer throw at the 1948 Summer Olympics and the 1952 Summer Olympics.

References

External links
 

1918 births
1982 deaths
Athletes (track and field) at the 1948 Summer Olympics
Athletes (track and field) at the 1952 Summer Olympics
Finnish male hammer throwers
Olympic athletes of Finland
People from Ilmajoki
Sportspeople from South Ostrobothnia